The Battle of Aga-Cayiri occurred in 1488 during the first Ottoman-Mamluk War.

References

Works cited 

Aga-Cayiri
1488 in Asia
Aga-Cayiri
Aga-Cayiri
Aga
Aga